This is a list of episodes from the second season of Cannon.

Broadcast history
The season originally aired Wednesdays at 10:00-11:00 pm (EST).

Episodes

Cannon (season 2)